In mathematics, the spheroidal wave equation is given by

It is a generalization of the Mathieu differential equation.
If  is a solution to this equation and we define , then  is a prolate spheroidal wave function in the sense that it satisfies the equation

See also
 Wave equation

References

Bibliography
 M. Abramowitz and I. Stegun, Handbook of Mathematical function (US Gov. Printing Office, Washington DC, 1964)
 H. Bateman, Partial Differential Equations of Mathematical Physics (Dover Publications, New York, 1944)

Ordinary differential equations